Sinderraj Lokenderraj (born 9 February 1938) is an Indian former cricketer. He played three first-class matches for Hyderabad between 1960 and 1962.

See also
 List of Hyderabad cricketers

References

External links
 

1938 births
Living people
Indian cricketers
Hyderabad cricketers
Cricketers from Hyderabad, India